The little rock thrush (Monticola rufocinereus) is a passerine bird in the family Muscicapidae. It is found in Eritrea, Ethiopia, Kenya, Oman, Saudi Arabia, Somalia, South Sudan, Tanzania, Uganda, and Yemen. It is found in rocky (Inland Cliffs and Mountain peaks) areas with some trees, and sometimes near settlements. At  this is the smallest of the Muscicapidae. The male has the head, throat and upper mantle blue-grey, the underparts orange-red, except for the center blackish center tail and tips which form an inverted T shape. The female is duller and paler. It is readily mistaken for a redstart because of its habit of trembling its tail.

References

Works cited

 

little rock thrush
Birds of the Horn of Africa
Birds of the Middle East
little rock thrush
Taxonomy articles created by Polbot